A master builder or master mason was the central figure leading construction projects in pre-modern times, thus, a precursor to the modern architect and engineer.

Master Builder(s) may also refer to:

 The Master Builder, an 1892 play by Henrik Ibsen
 A Master Builder, a 2013 film directed by Jonathan Demme
 "Master Builder", a song on Gong's 1974 album You
 Master Builders, minifigures who build without instructions featured in The Lego Movie
 Robert Moses, 20th Century urban planner based in New York City, often referred to as “master builder”